The Road to Rome is a play by American author Robert Sherwood. The plot revolves around Hannibal's attempt to capture Rome during the Second Punic War. It was Sherwood's first published play.

The play opened on Jan. 31, 1927 at the Playhouse Theatre in New York City and was considered a success, running until the next January. It was subsequently revived two months later at the same theater, running from Mar 21, 1928 until Jun 1929.

In 1930 it was played in Melbourne, Australia, by the Edith Taliaferro company as The Road to Romance.

In 1955, the play was adapted for the screen in musical version by Metro-Goldwyn-Mayer as Jupiter's Darling.

References

External links
 Full text of The Road to Rome at the Internet Archive

1927 plays
Plays by Robert E. Sherwood
Plays based on actual events
Plays set in ancient Rome
American plays adapted into films